A White Card (also known as a General Construction Induction Card) is a mandatory work card required in Australia to order to work on a construction site.

The White Card

Who needs the White Card?
The White Card is a required document for everyone wishing to work on the premises of a construction site. Additionally, it is also required for those not directly involved in building, such as supervisors, site managers, and people who routinely enter construction sites.

Validity
White Cards become void if no construction work is carried out in two consecutive years or more.

Courses
The white card is gained by completing a face-to-face or online government mandated course through a (RTO) registered training organisation. The unit of competency required is CPCCOHS1001A – Work Safely In The Construction Industry. 

The Card is, although it is issued by all the states by their own regulatory bodies, is valid across all Australia.

The White Card Online can be issued in Western Australia and Tasmania. In the other states the course must be completed face-to-face. The face-to-face courses can be completed with 6 hours of face-to-face training. Regardless, this White Card is mutually recognized and accepted in all states of Australia.

Curriculum
Workplace safety, safe working practices, dealing with hazards and how to respond to an emergency.

Course Requirements
 USI number, (Unique Student Identifier)
 Basic English language literacy
 Basic Mathematic literacy

Course by State

History
This White Card Course replaces a range of state systems operating different coloured cards (Blue, Green, Red) and regulatory bodies. In the past the different states/regulatory bodies would have different coloured cards for their own state. Every State in Australia now operate with the Nationally Recognized White Card. 

The white card online used to be offered in Queensland prior to 2019, however they changed to face-to-face only due to concerns of the mutual recognition by other states of the Queensland white card being at risk This was because allegedly the online courses offered for the Queensland white card were not up to standard.

References

Citations

Bibliography

External links
ACT government website explaining the White Card

Identity documents of Australia
Construction law
Employment in Australia